The West Indies Federal Archives Centre is the official depository of records from the defunct West Indies Federation. The centre was opened in 2004, and is part of the University of the West Indies at Cave Hill in Barbados. Prior to the centre's opening, the West Indies archives were held by the Barbados National Archives.

See also 
 List of archives in Barbados
 List of national archives

References

External links

Archives in Barbados
West Indies Federation
West Indies Federation
University of the West Indies
2004 establishments in North America
Saint Michael, Barbados
Government buildings completed in 2004